Sheikh Kamal Stadium is a football stadium in Nilphamari, Bangladesh. It is located on the opposite of Nilphamari Government College and is occasionally used for national day parade and handball games. The stadium, built in 1984, took on a new look after huge renovation works were completed in 2018 with approximately Taka 14 crore being spent on building up nearly 750 square-feet of gallery, a new VIP stand, earth filling, and planting fresh grass among other tasks. The seating capacity of the stadium has been subsequently increased to 20,000. Like other public stadiums, this venue is also owned by National Sports Council (NSC) of Bangladesh, and managed by District Sports Association of Nilphamari. On 12 November 2017 National Sports Council has renamed this stadium from Nilphamari District Stadium to Sheikh Kamal Stadium after Sheikh Kamal. This is the 14th venue used for Bangladesh Premier League (BPL) matches.

Hosting international events 
 The Bangladesh national football team played a FIFA international friendly on 29 August 2018 against  Sri Lanka national football team in front of a packed stadium. It was the first ever international friendly hosted by this stadium.
 On 21 September 2018, The venue hosted the international club friendly match between Bashundhara Kings and New Radiant SC of Maldives.

Current status (2018–present) 
The stadium served as the home ground of Bashundhara Kings, a football team which plays in the Bangladesh Premier League in 2018.

Attendance record 
Although the stadium has the capacity for 20,000; but 21,359 tickets were sold for Bangladesh versus Sri Lanka international friendly match.  it remains the highest capacity crowd in the stadium's history.

See also
 List of football stadiums in Bangladesh
 Stadiums in Bangladesh

References

Sports venues in Dhaka
Football venues in Bangladesh